Stephen Alan Schuker (born 1939) is an American historian who is currently William W. Corcoran Professor of History at the University of Virginia.

He was educated at Cornell University, where he gained a BA in 1959. In 1958 Cornell awarded him a $500 prize for being their outstanding history student. He was awarded an MA and a PhD by Harvard University in 1962 and 1969, respectively. According to Walter A. McDougall, Schuker's book The End of French Predominance in Europe is the definitive work on the circumstances leading to the adoption of the 1924 Dawes Plan on German reparations. The book was awarded the Gilbert Chinard Prize (in 1976) and the George Louis Beer Prize (in 1977).

Works
The End of French Predominance in Europe: The Financial Crisis of 1924 and the Adoption of the Dawes Plan (Chapel Hill: University of North Carolina Press, 1976).
American "Reparations" to Germany, 1919-33: Implications for the Third-World Debt Crisis (Princeton: Princeton Studies in International Finance, 1988).

Notes

External links
Contributions to the Foreign Policy Research Institute
'What Historians Get Wrong About World War I', Time (1 August 2014)

1939 births
21st-century American historians
21st-century American male writers
Living people
University of Virginia faculty
Cornell University alumni
Harvard University alumni
American male non-fiction writers